Melanella boscii is a species of sea snail, a marine gastropod mollusk in the family Eulimidae.

References

boscii
Gastropods described in 1848